Hanoi is the capital of Vietnam.

Hanoi may also refer to:
Hanoï (album), 2007 Indochine album
Hanoi (novel), a 1966 spy novel
Tower of Hanoi, a one player game of strategy